"Town of Oyster Bay Landmark" is a designation of the Town of Oyster Bay for buildings and other sites in the Town of Oyster Bay, New York. Listed sites are selected after meeting a combination of criteria, including historical, economic, architectural, artistic, cultural, and social values. Once a site is designated as a landmark, it is subject to the Town of Oyster Bay Landmarks Ordinance, which requires that any alterations beyond routine maintenance, up to and including demolition, must have their permit reviewed by the Landmarks Commission. Many Town of Oyster Bay Landmarks also are listed on the National Register of Historic Places, providing federal tax support for preservation.

Listings town-wide

Below is a list of the 40 current landmarks in the Town of Oyster Bay.  Dates of landmark designation and street addresses are as given by the town's register of landmarks.

Key

See also
 Oyster Bay History Walk
 New York State Historic Markers, Nassau County, Town of Oyster Bay
 National Register of Historic Places listings in Nassau County, New York

References

External links
 Town of Oyster Bay

Landmarks in Oyster Bay (town), New York
Oyster Bay
Town of Oyster Bay